Plano West Senior High School (commonly West, Plano West, or PWSH) is a public high school in Plano, Texas serving high school juniors and seniors. Plano West is named after its geographic location within West Plano. The school is part of the Plano Independent School District, and enrolls students based on the locations of students' homes. Students at Plano West attended one of two high schools: Jasper or Shepton. 

The combination of these two schools for 9th and 10th graders into the Plano West student body creates graduating classes of 1300-1500 students annually. Plano West was formed in the fall of 1999 as a newly renovated, former Shepton High School. Shepton High School then moved to 5505 W Plano Pkwy, Plano, TX 75093. Plano West is accredited by the Texas Education Agency, which designates the school as "Recognized." The school colors are royal blue, black, and white, and the mascot is the wolf, with the students recognizing the student body as "the wolf-pack." The school is ranked as 22nd in the nation, and as the #1 comprehensive high school in the State of Texas, according to Newsweek's 2016 list of best public high schools.

Athletics
The mascot is the wolf, a departure from the feline mascots of the two other senior high schools in Plano (the Plano Wildcats and the Plano East Panthers). 

The Plano West Wolves compete in the following sports:

 Baseball
 Basketball
 Cross Country
 Football
 Golf
 Soccer
 Softball
 Swimming & Diving
 Tennis
 Track & Field
 Volleyball
 Wrestling
 Lacrosse

Championships

Music
The Plano West Chamber Orchestra is made up of approximately 40 musicians.  It has won 1st place in the Texas Music Educators Association (TMEA) Honor Orchestra competition (recognizing the top high school string orchestras in Texas) 5 consecutive times, in 2002, 2004, 2006, 2008, and 2010 (TMEA rules prohibit a school from entering the competition the year after it has won), along with several top-5 finishes from 2011-2015.  The orchestra received the TMEA "Honor Orchestra" designation again in 2016 and 2019.  The orchestra has also been featured on the Disney Channel series "Totally in Tune" which aired in 2001. In 2005, the orchestra won a Cappie Award for Outstanding Pit Orchestra in a musical for the school production of Les Misérables.

The Choir Program performs at the annual Texas Music Educators Association Convention.

The Plano West Mighty Wolf Band has a marching and concert season and also has a winter guard program. In the 2009–2010 school year, the band had approximately 95 members; by 2015-2016, this had increased to about 195. The band was led by head director James Hannah from the school's founding until his retirement in 2017. Hannah was succeeded by long time Jasper High School band director Jackie Digby, who leads the band to this day.

Plano West has taught a jazz band alongside its normal band program since the school's opening. In 2018, due to increased membership, the school added a second jazz band. The Plano West Jazz Orchestra, directed by Preston Pierce, was named a finalist for the Essentially Ellington High School Jazz Band Competition in 2017, 2020, 2021, and 2022. The Jazz Orchestra was the invited high school Jazz Ensemble at the 2016 Texas Music Educators Association Convention. 

In 2011, Plano West was named one of only seven Gold Grammy Signature Schools for its music program. The award recognizes top U.S. public high schools making an outstanding commitment to music education.

Alumni

Ben Bass (Class of 2007) — NFL defensive end with the Dallas Cowboys and New England Patriots, formerly at Texas A&M University.
Kyle Bosworth (Class of 2005) — NFL linebacker with the Jacksonville Jaguars and Dallas Cowboys
Natalie Chou (Class of 2016) — NCAA shooting guard with the UCLA Bruins
 T. J. Cline (Class of 2012), American-Israeli basketball player
Geoffrey Groselle (Class of 2011) — professional basketball player.
Jackson Jeffcoat (Class of 2010) — NFL linebacker with the Washington Redskins, formerly defensive end at University of Texas at Austin. Currently with the Winnipeg Blue Bombers.
David Lofton (Class of 2002) — NFL defensive back with the Miami Dolphins, formerly at Stanford University.
Billy McKinney (Class of 2013) — MLB outfielder with the Los Angeles Dodgers
Jordan Pugh (Class of 2006) — NFL defensive back with the New Orleans Saints. Drafted in the 6th round out of Texas A&M University.
Leon Taylor (Class of 2011) — forward with Bodens BK and Tampa Bay Rowdies.
Vickiel Vaughn (Class of 2002) — NFL defensive back with the Denver Broncos, formerly at the University of Arkansas.

Debate
The Plano West Debate Team has had many successes over the tournament season, with bringing home many awards. The most recent of which include 1st place at the National Speech and Debate Tournament in 2020, for the events International Extemporaneous Speaking and Big Questions Debate. The team has had repeated success in cross-country and in-state tournaments, receiving many scholarships and creating opportunities for younger debate students to learn as well, through the Plano West Debate Camp.

See also
Plano East Senior High School
Plano Senior High School
Shepton High School
Jasper High School

References

External links 
 

High schools in Plano, Texas
Educational institutions established in 1999
1999 establishments in Texas
Public high schools in Texas
Plano Independent School District high schools